Eugenio Pablo Tigani (born November 16, 1955, Buenos Aires) is an Argentinian economist and political scientist recognized for his transdisciplinary work involving politics, economics, administration, corporate finance and leadership. His book Argenjapan’s has been translated into English. He is a critical exponent of technocracy. His contributions include the theoretical construction of the Technocratic Elites and their responsibility in the Governance Crisis of 2001.

Education 
Tigani studied the Argentine economy with Aldo Ferrer and Eduardo Curia at the Universidad Católica de la Plata (IDEPA-Institute of Applied Economic Policy). He has a degree in Business Administration from UADE, the Universidad Argentina de la Empresa (1979) revalidated by UBA, University of Buenos Aires (1981). He obtained his Master's Degree in International Economic Policy at the University of Belgrano (1988), years later he graduated as a Ph.D in Political Science (2018) at the Universidad de Belgrano.

Member of the Educational Community of Educators at Harvard Business Publishing.

Actually he is a postgraduate professor at UBA Law. The Faculty created the first University Chair of: Argentine Affairs, for foreign delegations, embassies and international companies. The team work teaching staff is shared by: Adolfo Pérez Esquivel, Santiago Leiras, Christian Asinelli, María del Carmen Squeff, Jorge Arguello, Rossana Surballe, Miguel Salguero, Marina Cardelli and Agustín Romero directs.

Career
From 1998 to 2001 he was a member of the panel of the accredited Cycle of monthly political, economics and business conferences with Miguel Ángel Broda and Rosendo Fraga. In October 2001, he was summoned by the senior judge of the Supreme Court Carlos Santiago Fayt to present his ideas to President Fernando de la Rúa, as a result of his work focused on solving the crisis of the Convertibility in Casa Rosada together with the Chief of Cabinet of the Chrystian Colombo Nation, focused on the structural transformation of the Argentine economy, in a long-term plan called "ARGENJAPAN'S debt solution and the take off of the economy."

From 2011 to 2017 he worked as a Master's professor at the Universidad Politecnica de Madrid CI BA. He is currently professor of postgraduate and Master's degrees at UBA and UADE respectively.

From 2008 to 2014 he was director of the Fundacion Esperanza for "political and economics research."

He was chief economist of the Fundacion Esperanza; founding partner of the Argentine Foreign Trade Forum chaired by Daniel Roel Mora, member of the Argentine Institute of Finance Executives (IAEF), member of the Professional Council of Economic Sciences and of the College of Graduated in Economic Sciences.

Publications
He was a columnist in the field of Foreign Trade and editor in charge of SMEs in ambito. He has been a guest by Bloomberg TV, CNN, EFE, AFP, TVE Televisión Española, Clarín, TN, La Nación, Cronista, INFOBAE, América Economía, BAE Negocios, Fortuna, O’ Glovo, 20minutos, Radio nacional, financial tribune, Perfil, AMERICAN EXPRESS.

Personal life 
Tigani resides with his wife Zulma Sequeiro (married in 1979) in Buenos Aires. They have two sons, a non-profit Christian organization that seeks to help people; and Jonathan is the mission director of CITA CON LA VIDA

Books 
 ARGENJAPANS I (2002)  
 ARGENJAPANS II (2003) 
 LIDERAZGO CONTUNDENTE (2009) 
 VIENTO DE KOLA (2011) 
 EQUAL (2011) 
 2001: FMI, TECNOCRACIA Y CRISIS (2018)

References 

Argentine economists
1955 births
Living people
University of Buenos Aires alumni
Argentine businesspeople
Argentine people of Spanish descent
Columbia Business School alumni